Mukund is an Indian name. Notable people with the name include:

Abhinav Mukund, Indian cricketer
Madhavan Mukund, Indian academic
Mukund Lal Agrawal, Indian politician
Mukund Lath, Indian academic
Mukund Parmar, Indian cricketer
Mukund Purohit, Indian businessman
Mukund Sathe, Indian cricketer
Mukund Varadarajan, Indian officer
Sanjay Mukund Kelkar, Indian politician

See also
Mukunda, a name for Vishnu